"Wrap My Body Tight" is the title of a number-one R&B single by Johnny Gill from his self-titled album, Johnny Gill. The song spent one week at number-one on the US R&B chart.  A remix to the song features added vocals from singer Karyn White.

Charts

See also
List of number-one R&B singles of 1991 (U.S.)

References

1991 singles
Johnny Gill songs
Song recordings produced by Jimmy Jam and Terry Lewis
1990 songs
Motown singles